The 1991 Reading Borough Council election was held on 2 May 1991, at the same time as other local elections across England and Wales. One third of Reading Borough Council's 45 seats were up for election. Since the previous election in 1990, the Conservative group on the council had split, with councillors Hamza Fuad and Pam Fuad forming their own independent group, the "Thames Conservatives", reducing the official Conservative numbers from 13 to 11. Neither of the Thames Conservatives' seats were in the third contested in 1991.

The election saw the Labour party increase its majority on the council.

Results

Ward results
The results in each ward were as follows (candidates with an asterisk* were the previous incumbent standing for re-election):

References

1991 English local elections
1991